In computer science, more precisely in automata theory, a recognizable set of a monoid is a subset that can be distinguished by some morphism to a finite monoid. Recognizable sets are useful in automata theory, formal languages and algebra.

This notion is different from the notion of recognizable language. Indeed, the term "recognizable" has a different meaning in computability theory.

Definition

Example
Indeed, such a language is recognized by the transition monoid of any automaton that recognizes the language.

Properties

 union
 intersection
 complement
 right and left quotient

McKnight's theorem states that if  is finitely generated then its recognizable subsets are rational subsets. 
This is not true in general, since the whole  is always recognizable but it is not rational if  is infinitely generated.

Conversely, a rational subset may not be recognizable, even if  is finitely generated.    

Also, in general,  is not closed under Kleene star. Indeed, its syntactic monoid is infinite.

The intersection of a rational subset and of a recognizable subset is rational.

Recognizable sets are closed under inverse of morphisms.

For finite groups the following result of Anissimov and Seifert is well known: a subgroup H of a finitely generated group G is recognizable if and only if H has finite index in G. In contrast, H is rational if and only if H is finitely generated.

See also

 Rational set
 Rational monoid

References

Jean-Eric Pin, Mathematical Foundations of Automata Theory, Chapter IV: Recognisable and rational sets

Further reading 
 

Automata (computation)